Relic of an Emissary is a television historical fiction drama produced by TVB. Some of the characters' names listed below are in Cantonese romanisation.

Ming Dynasty

Brocade Guards

Chu Wan-man's courtiers

Chu Tai's courtiers

Hing Yin Tsui Lau Brothel

Others

See also
Relic of an Emissary

Relic Of An Emissary
Relic Of An Emissary